Sérgio Luís de Araújo, usually known as Sérgio (born 11 May 1970 in Kaloré, Paraná), is a Brazilian football player who played as goalkeeper. Sergio retired in 2013 after playing for Taboão da Serra.

He played for Palmeiras, Portuguesa and Vitória in the Campeonato Brasileiro.

Titles

With Palmeiras
São Paulo State Championship: 1993, 1994, 1996
Rio-São Paulo Tournament: 1993, 2000
Brazilian Série A: 1993, 1994
Brazilian Cup: 1998
Mercosur Cup: 1998
Copa Libertadores: 1999
Brazilian Champions Cup: 2000
Brazilian Série B: 2003

with Itumbiara
Goiás State Championship: 2008

References

1970 births
Living people
Brazilian footballers
Association football goalkeepers
Sociedade Esportiva Palmeiras players
CR Flamengo footballers
Sport Club Internacional players
Associação Portuguesa de Desportos players
Esporte Clube Vitória players
Esporte Clube Santo André players
Esporte Clube Bahia players
Santos FC players
Ceilândia Esporte Clube players
Itumbiara Esporte Clube players
Copa Libertadores-winning players
Sportspeople from Paraná (state)